The West Perth Football Club, nicknamed the Falcons, is an Australian rules football club located in Joondalup, Western Australia. West Perth competes in the West Australian Football League (WAFL) and WAFL Women's (WAFLW) and is the oldest existing Australian rules football club in Western Australia. Originally located at Leederville Oval, the team was relocated in 1994 to Arena Joondalup, a sports complex in the northern suburbs of Perth. The team's club song is "It's a Grand Old Flag" and its traditional rivals are East Perth.

History

The Victorian Football Club was established at a meeting on 2 May 1885. The new team was to play its games at the Recreation Ground (now Esplanade Reserve) and wear the colours cardinal and navy. Two weeks after the establishment of the new club it formed the WAFA together with Rovers and Fremantle. The three clubs, along with High School (now Hale School) were to play out the 1885 season, however High School dropped out after just two rounds.

The West Australian Football Club was established in 1886 and were admitted to the competition for the 1887 season. At a meeting of the two clubs on 16 April 1889, it was unanimously decided to amalgamate the two clubs – West Australian and Victorians – into a single club known as the Metropolitan Football Club for the 1889 season. The West Australian colours of black and red were to be maintained for the new club. In 1891, a meeting of footballers was held to form a new team, to be called West Perth, which embraced the members of the then-defunct Metropolitan Football Club. The new club was immediately granted entry into the WA Football Association (later called the WA Football League) and won its first premiership in 1897.

In 1915 the team became the original tenant of the newly built Leederville Oval where it would remain based until 1993, at which time the team moved to Joondalup to play games at Arena Joondalup from the 1994 season onwards. Since relocating, the Falcons have enjoyed relative success with five premierships from nine grand finals, the most recent flag coming in 2022.

In 2022 the club became the seventh active club to participate in the WAFL Women's (WAFLW), the premier state-based competition for female footballers.

Club song

"It's a Grand Old Flag"

 It's a grand old flag it's a high flying flag, 
 It's the emblem for me and for you, 
 It's the emblem of the team we love, 
 The team of the red and the blue,

 Every heart beats true for the red and the blue, 
 And we sing this song to you, 
 Should old acquaintance be forgot, 
 Keep your eye on the red and the blue...

Honours

Club honours

Individual honours 
Sandover Medallists: (12 total) 

 1922: Harold Boyd 
 1924: Jim Gosnell 
 1927: Jim Craig
 1930: Ted Flemming
 1940: Terence O'Keefe
 1942: Laurie Bowen
 1946: John Loughridge
 1951: Fred Buttsworth
 1959: Brian Foley
 1992: Robert West
 1993: Neil Mildenhall
 2014: Aaron Black

Simpson Medallists: (11 total) 

 1946: John Loughridge
 1949: Jack Larcombe
 1951: Don Porter
 1960: Brian Foley
 1969: Bill Dempsey
 1971: Shane Sheridan

 1975: Mel Whinnen
 1995: Darren Harris
 1999: Christian Kelly
 2003: Brent LeCras
 2013: Mark Hutchings

Bernie Naylor Medalists: (20 total)

 1894: Bill Duffy (15)
 1898: Herb Loel (N/A)
 1899: Herb Loel (50)
 1900: Albert Daly (30)
 1901: Herb Loel (45)
 1902: Herb Loel (35)
 1903: Tom McNamara (32)
 1911: William Bellion (30)
 1925: Ted Flemming (50)
 1930: Frank Hopkins (79)

 1932: Ted Tyson (96)
 1936: Ted Tyson (126)
 1942: Ted Brunton (94)
 1945: Bill Baker (91)
 1951: Ray Scott (141)
 1955: Ray Scott (83)
 1963: Ron Evans (97)
 1973: Phil Smith (84)
 2018: Andrew Strijk (51)
 2019: Tyler Keitel (50)

All-Australians:

 1961: Ray Gabelich
 1972: Alan Watling

300 games

 Mel Whinnen (371)
 Bill Dempsey (343)

200 games:

 Alan Watling (284)
 Les Fong (284)
 Paul Mifka (283)
 Ray Scholfield (277)
 Wally Price (256)
 Peter Menaglio (236)
 E J (Ted) Flemming (229)
 Bill Rainoldi (228)
 E A (Ted) Tyson (228)

 Ken Ashdown (218)
 Jason Salecic (212)
 Norm McDiarmid (210)
 Max Tetly (210)
 Jim Craig (203)
 Brian Foley (202)
 Len Harman (201)
 Eddie Wylde (200)

(*) Indicates current listed players

Club records

Highest score: 
 Round 10, 1981 – 37–17 (239) vs. East Fremantle at Leederville Oval 
 Round 10, 1987 – 37–17 (239) vs. South Fremantle at Leederville Oval

Lowest score: 
 Round 1, 1912 – 0.3 (3) vs. Subiaco at WACA

Most games: 
 Mel Whinnen 371 (1960–1977)

Highest goal kicker (season): 
 E. Tyson 143 goals (1934)
 R. Scott 143 goals (1972)

Highest goal kicker (game): 
 E. Tyson 17 goals v. Swan Districts (1934)

Highest goal kicker (career): 
 E. Tyson 1119 goals

Longest serving captain: 
 Les Fong 7 Seasons (1980–1986)

Longest serving coach: 
 Bill Monaghan 10 Seasons (2009 – 2018)

Most club champion awards won: 
 Mel Whinnen 9

Record home attendance: 
 Round 21, 1978 – 24,567 vs. East Perth at Leederville Oval

Record finals attendance: 
 1975 Grand Final – 52,322 vs. South Fremantle at Subiaco Oval

WA Football Hall of Fame
West Perth players who have been inducted into the West Australian Football Hall of Fame:

Premierships

Grand finals 

1897:

 1899:

 1901:

 1905: West Perth 4–7 (31) def East Fremantle 3–9 (27)

 1932: West Perth 18–9 (117) def East Perth 11–8 (74)

 1934: West Perth 11–7 (73) def East Fremantle 5–9 (39)

 1935: West Perth 11–8 (74) def Subiaco 7–9 (51)

 1941: West Perth 14–14 (98) def East Fremantle 10–17 (77)

 1942: West Perth 19–16 (130) def Claremont 11–13 (79)

 1949: West Perth 16–13 (109) def Perth 12–7 (79)

 1951: West Perth 13–10 (88) def South Fremantle 12–13 (85)

 1960: West Perth 17–13 (115) def East Perth 12–11 (83)

 1969: West Perth 21–21 (147) def East Perth 10–14 (74)

 1971: West Perth 14–17 (101) def East Perth 9–15 (69)

 1975: West Perth 23–17 (155) def South Fremantle 7–9 (51)

 1995: West Perth 21–11 (137) def Subiaco 12–9 (81)

 1999: West Perth 14–13 (97) def South Fremantle 11–6 (72)

 2003: West Perth 13–9 (87) def Subiaco 9–10 (64)

 2013: West Perth 20–11 (131) def East Perth 12–10 (81)
 2022: West Perth 10-9 (69) def Claremont 8-9 (57)

Last premiership team

Club coaches

 1919: Paddy Willoughby 
 1920–21: Tony Tyson
 1921–22: Tom Soutar
 1923: Archie Herd
 1923–24: Jack Leckie
 1925: Bert Taylor
 1926–27: Tom Soutar
 1928–30: Harold Boyd
 1931: Sam Tyson
 1932–33: Jack Cashman
 1934–35: Johnny Leonard
 1936: Jack Cashman
 1937: Johnny Leonard
 1938–39: Max Tetley
 1940–41: Ross Hutchinson
 1942–45: Joe Brooker
 1946: Ross Hutchison
 1947–52: Stan Heal
 1953–54: Peter O'Donohue
 1955: Don Scott
 1956–57: Frank Sparrow

 1958: Ray Schofield
 1959: Don Marinko, Jr.
 1960–63: Arthur Olliver
 1964: Clive Lewington
 1965–67: Bob Spargo
 1968–71: Graham Farmer
 1972: Peter Steward
 1973–74: Dennis Jones
 1975–77: Graham Campbell
 1978–79: Percy Johnson
 1979–81: Graham Campbell
 1982–84: Dennis Cometti
 1985–86: John Wynne
 1987–88: Bruce Monteath
 1989–91: George Michalczyk
 1992–94: Jeff Gieschen
 1995–99: John Dimmer
 2000–01: Andrew Lockyer
 2002–05: Darren Harris
 2006–08: Todd Curley
 2009–17: Bill Monaghan
 2018–21: Geoff Valentine
 2022- Darren Harris

Club captains

 1885–86: Alexander Rankin
 1887: Horace Wilson
 1888: Harry Sadler
 1889: Frederick McDonough
 1890: Jack Kneale
 1891: Ken McKenzie
 1892: Alfred Newlands
 1893–94: George Sykes
 1895: James Morgan
 1896: Jack Coward and David DeCoit
 1897–1900: Barney Grecian
 1901: Les Jones and Billy Plunkett (1)
 1902: Herbert Loel (1)
 1903: Herbert Loel (2) and Bundy McNamara
 1904: Billy Plunkett (2)
 1905: Billy Plunkett (3) and Shooter Ford (1)
 1906: Shooter Ford (2)
 1907: Gerald Balme (1)
 1908: Frederick Strickland
 1909: Jim Everett
 1910–11: Gerald Balme (2)
 1912: Gerald Balme (3) and Bill Mose
 1913–14: Samuel Rowe
 1915–16: Anthony Austin
 1917: Samuel Jeffery
 1918: Jack O'Dea
 1919: Paddy Willoughby
 1920: Tony Tyson
 1921–22: Tom Soutar (1)
 1923–24: Harold Boyd
 1925: Bert Taylor
 1926: Tom Soutar (2)
 1927: Donald Sinclair
 1928: Bill McRae, Jim Gosnell, Jim Craig (1), and Jack McDiarmid
 1929: Ernest Moyle
 1930: Jim Craig (2)
 1931: Ted Flemming (1)
 1932–33: Jack Cashman
 1934–35: Don Marinko, Sr.

 1936: Bill Benton
 1937: Ted Flemming (2) and Wally Buttsworth
 1938–39: Max Tetly
 1940–41: Dick Hill
 1941: Spike Pola (1)
 1942–43: Len Harman
 1944: Fred Buttsworth
 1945: Spike Pola (2)
 1946: Ross Hutchinson
 1947–51: Stan Heal
 1952: Ray Schofield (1)
 1953–54: Peter O'Donohue
 1955: Don Scott
 1956: Frank Sparrow
 1957–58: Ray Schofield (2)
 1959–60: Don Marinko, Jr.
 1961–64: Brian Foley
 1965–67: Bob Spargo
 1968–71: Graham Farmer
 1972: Peter Steward
 1973–76: Bill Dempsey
 1977: Mel Whinnen
 1978: Arthur Duckworth
 1979: Geoff Taylor
 1980–86: Les Fong
 1987–89: Peter Menaglio
 1990: Paul Hasler
 1991: David Palm
 1992–94: Craig Nelson
 1995–96: Darren Harris
 1997–98: Brendan Barrows
 1999–2000: Kim Rigoll (1)
 2001–03: Steve Trewhella
 2004: Kim Rigoll (2)
 2005: Todd Curley
 2006–07: Clayton Lasscock
 2008–13: Jason Salecic
 2014–15: Jay van Berlo (1) and Luke Tedesco
 2016–17: Jay van Berlo (2)
 2018-: Aaron Black

Current squad
As of October 2022:

 1 Aaron Black
 2 Luke Meadows
 3 Ben Johnson
 4 Tyson Moulton
 5 Nathan Alexandre
 6 Dylan Yem
 7 Keegan Knott
 8 Mark Hutchings
 9 Trent Manzone
 10 Zac Guadagnin
 11 Mitchell Antonio
 12 Liam Tedesco
 13 Dean Munns
 14 Shane Nelson
 15 Aidan Lynch
 16 Mitchell Dobson
 17 Blake Wilhelm
 18 Scott Nelson
 19 Sam Rotham
 20 Anton Hamp
 21 Tristan Hobley
 22 Kellen Johnson
 23 Conal Lynch
 24 Thomas O'Donnell
 
 25 Mitchell Peirce
 26 Troy Yukich
 27 Nathan Murray
 28 Zac Patterson
 29 Alec Johnson
 30 Callum Johnson
 31 Michael Mallard
 32 Rudy Riddoch
 33 Koopah Todd
 34 Ryan Hudson
 35 Logan Foley
 36 Mark Hamilton
 37 Tyler Keitel
 38 Noah Pegoraro
 39 Rowan Garlett
 40 Benjamin Delaporte
 41 Sasha Kernutt
 42 Thomas Boyes
 43 Lochlan Paton
 44 Joshua Munns

 45 Corey Rundle
 46 Darcy Dixon
 47 Lachlan Cox
 48 Rohan Scurria
 49 Zachary Fleiner
 50 Luke Reilly
 51 Connor Klemke
 52 Joseph Hinder
 53 Jack Burke
 55 Brock Lewis
 56 Jared Cole

Team of the Century

AFL/VFL players (including rookies)
This is a list of West Perth players who have played at AFL/VFL level:

 Jaxon Prior (Brisbane Lions)
 Blake Acres (St Kilda)
 Marcus Adams (Western Bulldogs and Brisbane Lions)
 Oscar Allen (West Coast)
 Ian Anderson (Essendon)
 Horrie Bant (1882–1957) (St Kilda and Essendon)
 Laurie Bellotti (West Coast)
 Bill Benton (1906–1979) (Richmond)
 Jack Beveridge (1907–1986) (Collingwood)
 Darren Bewick (Essendon)
 Rohan Bewick (Brisbane Lions)
 Ashley Blurton (West Coast and Richmond)
 Kepler Bradley (Essendon and Fremantle)
 Phil Bradmore (Footscray)
 Bruce Bridges (1917–1999) (Fitzroy)
 Steven Browne (Carlton)
 Jeff Bruce (Fitzroy)
 Bill Burns (1884–1955) (Geelong and Richmond)
 Ronnie Burns (Geelong and Adelaide)
 Fred Buttsworth (Essendon)
 Wally Buttsworth (1917–2002) (Essendon)
 Adam Campbell (Fremantle)
 Jack Cashman (1906–1982) (Fitzroy and Carlton)
 Callum Chambers (West Coast and Carlton)
 Kevin Clarke (1931–2009) (Melbourne and Carlton)
 Ernie Coward (1916–1985) (Essendon)
 Phil Cronan (St Kilda and Footscray)
 Todd Curley (Collingwood and Footscray/Western Bulldogs)
 Jack Darling (West Coast)
 Bill Davern (1883–1952) (Geelong)
 Jim Davies (1926–2010) (Carlton)
 Barry Day (Essendon)
 Ian Downsborough (West Coast, Port Adelaide and Adelaide)
 Billy Duckworth (Essendon)
 John Duckworth (Fitzroy)
 Max Duffy (Fremantle)
 Russell Ellen (Essendon)
 Neil Evans (Essendon)
 Ron Evans (1939–2007) (Essendon)
 Brian Falconer (Hawthorn)
 Graham Farmer (Geelong)
 Brendon Fewster (West Coast and Fremantle)
 Vic Fisher (1924–1999) (Essendon)
 Shane Fitzsimmons (Melbourne)
 Dan Foley (Richmond)
 Arthur Ford (1881–1953) (Carlton)
 Peter Freeman (St Kilda)
 Ray Gabelich (1933–2000) (Collingwood)
 John Gastev (West Coast and Brisbane Bears)
 Barney Grecian (1872–1919) (Essendon)
 Ralph Green (1911–1991) (Carlton)
 Chris Groom (Adelaide, Fremantle and North Melbourne)
 Brad Gwilliam (West Coast and Richmond)
 Derek Hall (West Coast and Geelong)
 Len Halley (Essendon)
 Jack Heal (1919–1988) (Melbourne)
 Stan Heal (1920–2010) (Melbourne)
 Trevor Heath (Essendon)
 Col Hebbard (Essendon)
 Bradley Hill (Hawthorn)
 Stephen Hill (Fremantle)
 Ray Holden (Melbourne)
 Mark Hutchings (West Coast)
 Jordan Jones (West Coast)
 Derek Kickett (North Melbourne, Essendon and Sydney Swans)
 Sean King (West Coast)
 Steven Koops (Fremantle and Western Bulldogs)
 Dean Laidley (West Coast and North Melbourne)
 Ken Leahy (1906–1985) (Geelong)
 Brent LeCras (North Melbourne)
 Mark LeCras (West Coast)
 Teddy Lockwood (1872–1953) (Geelong and Collingwood)
 Justin Longmuir (Fremantle)
 Troy Longmuir (Melbourne, Fremantle and Carlton)
 Ray Lucev (South Melbourne)
 Quinten Lynch (West Coast and Collingwood)
 Tom Marinko (1941–1981) (St Kilda)
 Josh Mellington (Fremantle)
 Mark Merenda (Richmond and West Coast)
 Paul Mifka (West Coast)
 Neil Mildenhall (Fremantle)
 Ray Niven (1910–1992) (Fitzroy and Melbourne)
 Darren O'Brien (Melbourne)
 Peter O'Donohue (1923–2012) (Hawthorn)
 David Palm (Richmond)
 Michael Pettigrew (Port Adelaide)
 Len Phillips (1890–19??) (St Kilda and Essendon)
 Andrew Purser (Footscray)
 Bert Renfrey (1879–1940) (St Kilda)
 George Renwick (1886–1945) (Carlton)
 Arthur Retell (1906–1978) (St Kilda)
 Laurie Richards (Fitzroy)
 Mike Richardson (Collingwood, Essendon and Brisbane Bears)
 Jon Riggs (St Kilda)
 Austin Robertson Sr. (1907–1988) (South Melbourne)
 Nick Robertson (Brisbane Lions)
 Bob Robinson (1914–2001) (Fitzroy)
 Warren Roper (Collingwood)
 Brian Sampson (1941–2012) (Essendon)
 Don Scott (South Melbourne)
 Paul Shanahan (1948–2011) (Fitzroy)
 Josh Smith (North Melbourne)
 Phil Smith (1946–2010) (Geelong)
 Craig Smoker (Melbourne)
 Bob Spargo (Footscray)
 Darren Stanley (Footscray)
 Peter Steward (North Melbourne)
 Andrew Strijk (West Coast)
 Paul Symmons (West Coast)
 John Towner (Essendon)
 Craig Turley (West Coast and Melbourne)
 Bill Valli (Collingwood and Essendon)
 Jay van Berlo (Fremantle)
 Nathan van Berlo (Adelaide)
 Robert Warnock (Fremantle and Carlton)
 Robbie West (West Coast and Footscray)
 Martin Whitelaw (Fremantle)
 Ike Whittaker (Footscray)
 Andrew Williams (West Coast and Collingwood)
 Don Williams (1935–1995) (Melbourne)
 Frank Williams (1884–1939) (St Kilda)
 Tom Williams (1876–1938) (Essendon)
 Troy Wilson (West Coast)
 Fred Wimbridge (1893–1977) (South Melbourne)

See also
West Perth players

References and notes

External links

 
 AustralianFootball.com: History of West Perth
 Team of the Century

 
Australian rules football clubs in Western Australia
Australian rules football clubs established in 1885
West Australian Football League clubs
1885 establishments in Australia